El Porvenir Airport  is an airport serving El Porvenir, in Panama. All approaches and departures will be over the water.

Airlines and destinations

See also
Transport in Panama
List of airports in Panama

References

External links
 OpenStreetMap - El Porvenir Airport
 OurAirports - El Porvenir Airport
 Landing at El Porvenir YouTube
 

Airports in Panama
Guna Yala